The B&O Warehouse is a building in Baltimore, Maryland, adjacent to Oriole Park at Camden Yards. It was constructed by the Baltimore and Ohio Railroad (B&O) beginning in 1899, with later sections completed in 1905, adjacent to the B&O's Camden Station and Freight Yard, which was located at the corner of Camden St and Eutaw St.

Railroad historian Herbert H. Harwood proclaimed it an "awesome structure ... a truly classic turn-of-the-century railroad warehouse." The warehouse was used by the B&O through the 1960s but was mostly vacant by the 1970s due to the use of trucks and newer, more efficient single-floor warehouses located in industrial parks elsewhere.

The former B&O Warehouse was incorporated into Oriole Park at Camden Yards when it opened in 1992 and looms over the stadium's right field wall. The warehouse was converted to team offices, team spaces, and a private club for the Orioles. It is also used for private wedding receptions.

In the entire history of Oriole Park at Camden Yards, Ken Griffey Jr. has been the only player to hit the B&O Warehouse with a ball hit in fair territory. He did so in the 1993 MLB Home Run Derby, in which he tied Juan González before losing in a playoff. No player has ever hit the warehouse in a game.

External links
 
 B&O Warehouse on Google Street View
 Baltimore & Ohio Warehouse at Camden Yards

References

Baltimore and Ohio Railroad
Baltimore Orioles
Buildings and structures in Baltimore
Downtown Baltimore
Historic warehouses in the United States
Commercial buildings completed in 1905
1905 establishments in Maryland